The Sheehan House, at 206 N. Maple St. in Falmouth, Kentucky, was listed on the National Register of Historic Places in 1983.	

Built around 1870 on the Bullock lot at Maple & Shelby, the house was moved to the 206 N. Maple St. site in 1893 and placed on a stone foundation.  It had a five-bay facade with a full-length front porch with turned posts and machine cut trim.  Its south facade had a bay with bracketed cornice.

Sheehan bought the house from Bullock heirs in 1919 and was owner of a feed and grain business at the foot of Maple Street.

The house appears no longer at the location.

References

National Register of Historic Places in Pendleton County, Kentucky
1870 establishments in Kentucky
Houses completed in 1870
Houses in Pendleton County, Kentucky
Houses on the National Register of Historic Places in Kentucky
Relocated houses
Relocated buildings and structures in Kentucky
Former buildings and structures in Kentucky
Falmouth, Kentucky